The 2014 NCAA Division III football season, play of college football in the United States organized by the National Collegiate Athletic Association at the Division III level, was the most recent season of NCAA Division III football. The season began on September 4 and concluded on December 19 with title game of the NCAA Division III Football Championship.  Wisconsin–Whitewater won their sixth Division III title with a 43–34 win over Mount Union at Salem Football Stadium in Salem, Virginia.  This was the ninth time in ten seasons that Mount Union and Wisconsin–Whitewater met in the title game.

Conference changes and new programs

Conference standings

Conference summaries

Headlines
 October 18
 Lance Leipold, head coach at Wisconsin–Whitewater, sets an all-divisions NCAA record for the fewest games required to reach 100 career wins, doing so in his 106th career game, a 52–3 blowout of Wisconsin–Eau Claire. The previous record was set by Hall of Fame coach Gil Dobie, who reached the 100-win mark in his 108th game at Cornell in 1921.

Postseason

Twenty-four conferences met the requirements for an automatic ("Pool A") bid to the playoffs. Besides the NESCAC, which does not participate in the playoffs, three conferences had no Pool A bid. The MASCAC and SAA were in the second year of the two-year waiting period; the SCAC had only four members, three short of the requirement. The American Southwest, which had fallen below seven members in 2013, was in the second year of the two-year grace period.

Schools not in Pool A conferences were eligible for Pool B. The number of Pool B bids was determined by calculating the ratio of Pool A conferences to schools in those conferences and applying that ratio to the number of Pool B schools. The 24 Pool A conferences contained 207 schools, an average of 8.6 teams per conference. Twenty-four schools were in Pool B, enough for two bids.

The remaining six playoff spots were at-large ("Pool C") teams.

Playoff bracket
{{32TeamBracket|compact=yes|seeds=no
| team-width=14em
| RD1=First RoundNovember 22Campus Sites
| RD2=Second RoundNovember 29Campus Sites
| RD3=QuarterfinalsDecember 6Campus Sites
| RD4=SemifinalsDecember 13Campus Sites
| RD5=National Championship GameDecember 19

| RD1-team01= Wisconsin–Whitewater*
| RD1-score01= 55
| RD1-team02= Macalester
| RD1-score02= 2
| RD1-team03= Wabash*
| RD1-score03= 33
| RD1-team04= Franklin
| RD1-score04=14
| RD1-team05= Saint John's (MN)*
| RD1-score05= 35| RD1-team06= St. Scholastica
| RD1-score06=7
| RD1-team07= Wartburg*| RD1-score07= 37| RD1-team08= St. Thomas (MN)
| RD1-score08= 31

| RD1-team09= Widener*| RD1-score09= 36| RD1-team10= Muhlenberg
| RD1-score10= 35
| RD1-team11= Delaware Valley*
| RD1-score11= 26
| RD1-team12= Christopher Newport| RD1-score12= 29| RD1-team13= Linfield*| RD1-score13= 55| RD1-team14= Chapman
| RD1-score14= 24
| RD1-team15= Mary Hardin–Baylor*| RD1-score15= 27| RD1-team16= Texas Lutheran
| RD1-score16= 20

| RD1-team17= Wesley*| RD1-score17= 52| RD1-team18= Hampden–Sydney
| RD1-score18= 7
| RD1-team19= Husson*
| RD1-score19= 20
| RD1-team20= MIT| RD1-score20= 27*| RD1-team21= Johns Hopkins*| RD1-score21= 24| RD1-team22= Rowan
| RD1-score22= 16
| RD1-team23= Hobart*| RD1-score23= 22| RD1-team24= Ithaca
| RD1-score24=15

| RD1-team25= Wheaton (IL)*| RD1-score25= 43| RD1-team26= Benedictine (IL)
| RD1-score26=14
| RD1-team27= John Carroll*| RD1-score27= 63| RD1-team28= Centre
| RD1-score28= 28
| RD1-team29= Wittenberg*
| RD1-score29= 25
| RD1-team30= Washington & Jefferson| RD1-score30= 41| RD1-team31= Mount Union*| RD1-score31= 63| RD1-team32= Adrian
| RD1-score32=3

| RD2-team01= Wisconsin–Whitewater*
| RD2-score01= 38| RD2-team02= Wabash
| RD2-score02= 14
| RD2-team03= St. John's (MN)
| RD2-score03= 10
| RD2-team04= Wartburg*
| RD2-score04=21| RD2-team05= Widener*
| RD2-score05= 37| RD2-team06= Christopher Newport
| RD2-score06= 27
| RD2-team07= Linfield| RD2-score07= 31| RD2-team08= Mary Hardin–Baylor*
| RD2-score08=28

| RD2-team09= Wesley*
| RD2-score09= 59| RD2-team10= MIT
| RD2-score10= 0
| RD2-team11= Johns Hopkins
| RD2-score11= 21
| RD2-team12= Hobart*
| RD2-score12=24| RD2-team13= Wheaton (IL)*
| RD2-score13= 12
| RD2-team14= John Carroll| RD2-score14= 14| RD2-team15= Washington & Jefferson
| RD2-score15= 0
| RD2-team16= Mount Union*
| RD2-score16=67| RD3-team01= Wisconsin–Whitewater*
| RD3-score01= 37| RD3-team02= Wartburg
| RD3-score02=33

| RD3-team03=Widener*
| RD3-score03= 7
| RD3-team04= Linfield| RD3-score04=45| RD3-team05= Wesley*
| RD3-score05= 41| RD3-team06= Hobart
| RD3-score06=13

| RD3-team07= John Carroll
| RD3-score07=28
| RD3-team08= Mount Union*
| RD3-score08=36| RD4-team01= Wisconsin–Whitewater*
| RD4-score01= 20| RD4-team02=Linfield
| RD4-score02= 14
| RD4-team03= Wesley
| RD4-score03= 21
| RD4-team04= Mount Union*
| RD4-score04= 70| RD5-team01= Wisconsin-Whitewater| RD5-score01= 43| RD5-team02= Mount Union
| RD5-score02= 34
}}
* Home team    † Overtime    Winner'''

See also
2014 NCAA Division I FBS football season
2014 NCAA Division I FCS football season
2014 NCAA Division II football season

References